The Gibbs Humdinga is a high speed amphibious vehicle concept designed by Gibbs Technologies. It was publicly announced in February 2012 and was created specifically to access remote and hostile terrain. It uses the same High Speed Amphibian (HSA) technology as the Gibbs Aquada. It has yet to be sold to the public.

The Humdinga transforms from land to water mode when the driver pushes a button. The wheels retract and the power train disconnects from driving the wheels to driving only the jet propulsion system.

On water the Humdinga can reach the 'plane' in less than 10 seconds.

The vehicle can seat up to 9 occupants (depending on configuration), along with supplies and baggage. The vehicle is run by a powerful  engine. It took 15 years and over a million man hours to develop the amphibious technology used, according to Alan Gibbs, co-founder.

See also
 Amphicar (1961)
 Gibbs Aquada (2004)
 Gibbs Quadski (2006)
 WaterCar
 Hummer

References

External links 
 
Gizmag - Humdinga article
Digital Journal - Phibian and Humdinga II article
Strange Vehicles - Gibbs Humdinga
Press Release - Gibbs name change

Wheeled amphibious vehicles